Elke Mackenzie (11 September 1911 – 18 January 1990), born Ivan Mackenzie Lamb, was a British polar explorer and botanist who specialised in the field of lichenology.

Early life
Mackenzie was born in Clapham, London, on 11 September 1911. Mackenzie's family moved to Scotland while she was a child, and she was enrolled in the Edinburgh Academy. After her graduation in 1929, she attended Edinburgh University. She earned her B.Sc. with Honors in Botany in 1933. She received a scholarship from the German Academic Exchange Service, and continued doing research in botany at the University of Munich and the University of Würzburg.

Career
Mackenzie was appointed as an assistant keeper at the British Museum (Natural History) in 1935 under the direction of lichenologist Annie Lorrain Smith. Mackenzie became especially interested in the lichen flora of the antarctic, as it was comparatively unknown, and she began studying early British, French, and Belgian antarctic collections in Turkey and Paris. She earned her Doctor of Science from Edinburgh University in 1942.

Mackenzie is famous for her part in Operation Tabarin, a secret mission instigated by Churchill during the Second World War. On the surface, it was an antarctic expedition organized to demonstrate British sovereignty in the Antarctic Peninsula. Mackenzie joined the crew in 1943. She collected lichen samples and conducted experiments on the accumulation of snow and subsequent thawing. Mackenzie discovered a number of lichen species, including Verrucaria serpuloides, a marine lichen. Mackenzie remained in Antarctica until 1946.

After the war, Mackenzie became Professor of Cryptogramic Botany at National University of Tucumán and traveled extensively in Argentina and Brazil.  In 1950, Mackenzie was put into contact with Erling Porsild, who hired her as a cryptogamic botanist at the National Museum of Canada in Ottawa. After the move to Canada, Mackenzie sold her private herbarium of 3,200 specimens to the Canadian Museum of Nature. She continued to collect, gathering specimens from all throughout Canada.

In 1953, Mackenzie was offered the directorship of the Farlow Herbarium of Cryptogamic Botany by Harvard University, and she left Canada. Mackenzie returned to Antarctica in October 1964, where she began SCUBA investigations with her colleagues from France and Argentina, under a grant from the National Science Foundation and with the logistic support of the Argentine Navy. Mackenzie referred to this study as "Operation Gooseflesh." For the three following years, she continued to collect throughout Europe and Mexico.

Mackenzie had a rivalry with Carroll William Dodge, citing the latter's "reckless taxonomy".

Personal life
In 1971, Mackenzie was diagnosed with gender dysphoria, underwent a sex reassignment surgery, and renamed herself from Ivan Lamb to Elke Mackenzie. She joined a theater troupe under direction of Laurence Senelick. Mackenzie retired from the Farlow Herbarium in 1972. Senelick stated that Mackenzie was forced into retirement after her transition.

During the next six years, Mackenzie lost interest in her botany work, preferring to translate German botanical text books into English. She constructed an A-frame bungalow in Costa Rica, and moved there in 1976. In 1980, Mackenzie returned to Cambridge to live with her daughter, citing political unrest. She took up woodworking, but was diagnosed with Lou Gehrig's disease in 1983. She died in 1990.  Her lifelong work on a monograph of Stereocaulon was never completed.

Legacy
Mackenzie is the namesake of two genera, Lambia (genus of green algae in the family Bryopsidaceae) and Lambiella (genus of lichen-forming fungi in the family Xylographaceae), and several species. 
The list of species includes:
Buellia lambii
Neuropogon lambii
Parmelia lambii
Placopsis lambii
Verrucaria mackenzie-lambii

Cape Lamb on Vega Island is named for Mackenzie.

Awards
Mackenzie was the recipient of both the British and United States Polar Medals for her involvement in Operation Tabarin.

Selected publications
Mackenzie published 43 papers over a 43-year period.
Lamb, I. M. (1936). Lichenological notes from the British Museum herbarium. I. Journal of Botany 74: 174-178
Lamb, I. M. (1948). New, rare or interesting lichens from the southern hemisphere. I. Lilloa 14: 203-251
Lamb, I. M. (1953). New, rare or interesting lichens from the southern hemisphere. II. Lilloa 26: 401-438
Lamb, I. M. (1955). New lichens from northern Patagonia, with notes on some related species. Farlowia 4: 423-471
Lamb, I. M. (1970). Antarctic terrestrial plants and their ecology, pp. 733–751. In M. W. Holdgate (ed.), Antarctic Ecology. London and New  York.
Lamb, I. M. (2018). The Secret South: A Tale of Operation Tabarin, 1943–46 (S. Haddelsey, R. Lewis-Smith, Ed.). Greenhill Books.

References

External links
 Biography of Ivan Mackenzie Lamb
 Obituary in The Lichenologist 23: 85-87. 1991
 Ivan Mackenzie Lamb's Studies of Marine Algae
 Index Nominum Lichenum Inter Annos 1932 et 1960 Divulgatorum i–xii, 1–810, 1963 (I.M. Lamb's 810 page list of lichen names)

British botanists
Women botanists
British lichenologists
Botanists with author abbreviations
1911 births
1990 deaths
Transgender women
British LGBT scientists
Transgender scientists
Alumni of the University of Edinburgh
Transgender academics
20th-century LGBT people